This page provides the summaries of the CAF First Round matches for 2014 FIFA World Cup qualification.

Format
In this round the twenty-four lowest seeded teams were drawn into 12 home-and-away ties, at the World Cup Preliminary Draw at the Marina da Glória in Rio de Janeiro, Brazil on 30 July 2011.

The matches were scheduled to be held with first legs on 11 November 2011 and second legs on 15 November 2011. The 12 winners advanced to the second round of the African qualifiers.

Seeding
The July 2011 FIFA Ranking was used to seed the teams.

Results

|}

Kenya won 7–0 on aggregate and advanced to the Second Round.

Togo won 2–1 on aggregate and advanced to the Second Round.

Namibia won 8–0 on aggregate and advanced to the Second Round.

Mozambique won 5–1 on aggregate and advanced to the Second Round.

Equatorial Guinea won 3–2 on aggregate and advanced to the Second Round.

Ethiopia won 5–0 on aggregate and advanced to the Second Round.

Lesotho won 3–2 on aggregate and advanced to the Second Round.

Rwanda won 4–2 on aggregate and advanced to the Second Round.

Congo DR won 8–2 on aggregate and advanced to the Second Round.

Congo won 6–1 on aggregate and advanced to the Second Round.

2–2 on aggregate. Tanzania won on the away goals rule and advanced to the Second Round.

Goalscorers
There were 66 goals scored in 22 matches, for an average of 3 goals per match.

3 goals

 Dioko Kaluyituka
 Trésor Mputu
 Dennis Oliech
 Lazarus Kaimbi

2 goals

 Mahamat Labbo 
 Shimelis Bekele
 Getaneh Kebede
 Rudolf Bester
 Sydney Urikhob
 Sidumo Shongwe

1 goal

 Cedric Amissi
 Selemani Ndikumana
 Mohamed Youssouf
 Gladys Bokese
 Yves Diba Ilunga
 Ladislas Douniama
 Chris Malonga
 Matt Moussilou
 Francis N'Ganga
 Prince Oniangue
 Harris Tchilimbou
 Viera Ellong
 Juvenal
 Randy
 Abraham Tedros
 Tesfalem Tekle
 Oumed Oukri
 Basile de Carvalho
 Bokang Mothoane
 Lehlomela Ramabele
 Thapelo Tale
 Brian Onyango
 Titus Mulama
 Pascal Ochieng
 Victor Wanyama
 Yvan Rajoarimanana
 Falimery Ramanamahefa
 Clésio Baúque
 Domingues
 Miro
 Jerry Sitoe
 Whiskey
 Heinrich Isaacks
 Labama Bokota
 Jean-Claude Iranzi
 Olivier Karekezi
 Elias Uzamukunda
 Orlando Gando
 Nurdin Bakari
 Mrisho Ngassa
 Serge Gakpé

1 own goal
 Jonas Mendes (playing against Togo)

Notes

References

External links
Results and schedule (FIFA.com version)
Results and schedule (CAFonline.com version)

1
Qual